Inna Alfredovna Utkina née Bekker is a former pair skater. She competed for the Soviet Union as Inna Bekker with partner Sergei Likhanski, becoming a two-time World Junior medalist (silver in 1982, bronze in 1983) and the 1983 Nebelhorn Trophy champion. They were coached by Irina Rodnina in Moscow.

After retiring from competition, Utkina became a coach in Moscow. She has coached Lubov Iliushechkina / Nodari Maisuradze, Anastasia Martiusheva / Alexei Rogonov, Maria Paliakova / Nikita Bochkov, and others.

Utkina is originally from Temirtau, Kazakhstan.

Competitive highlights 
(with Likhanski)

References 

Living people
Figure skaters from Moscow
Russian figure skating coaches
Soviet female pair skaters
World Junior Figure Skating Championships medalists
Year of birth missing (living people)
Female sports coaches